Yongdusan Park is a park located in Jung-gu, Busan, South Korea. The 120-meter-high Busan Tower is located here.

Yongdu means "dragon's head" and "san" means "mountain". The name is an allusion to the similarity of the mountain park, which is said to resemble a dragon's head. The park occupies an area of 69,000 square meters. It has 70 different species of trees growing in it.

Features
One of the highlights of the Yongdusan Park is the statue of Yi Sun-sin, Korea's 16th-century naval hero. The park also has a bust of writer Ahn Huijae. There is also the commemorative monument for the April 19th anti-government student protests. The most conspicuous of the park's feature is the Busan Tower.

Museum of World Folk Instruments
The park also contains the Museum of World Folk Instruments. The museum is housed in a two-story building and contains exhibits various musical instruments, including instruments made from fruits, human knee bones and, it's said, rat skin. The unique feature of the museum is that visitors are allowed to handle and play the instruments on display.

Exhibition Hall of World Model Boats
Another attraction at the park is the Exhibition Hall of World Model Boats. The exhibit contains over 80 models of traditional Korean yellow-hemp sailboats and turtle ships as well as those of the costliest luxury cruise ships and some of the most sophisticated warships.

Arts Performance
The park turns into a festival site every Saturday at 3 pm onward as a traditional arts performance is held there. The performances are held from March through November.

Attractions
Busan Tower(73.11.21) – 129m high (2 lifts), 1,510 m2 (Exhibition hall and Souvenir shop)
 Palgakjeong (Octagonal Pavilion) (73.11.21) – 3 stories, 915 m2 (1F:Aquarium, 2,3F:resting place)
Exhibition pavilion(73.11.21) – 2 stories, 1,900 m2
Statue of the Great general Yi Sun sin(56.3.20) – 12m high
 Cheongdongyongtap (Bronze Dragon tower) (89.9.7) – 4m high, Donganhuijehyungsang(a bust of an activist for    national independence, An Huije (pen name, Dongan) – stone bust
Flower clock (73.10.8))- 5m in diameter
Welfare Center for the Elderly - 413 m2
Literary monuments – 9 monuments made of native rock
Busan citizens' bell pavilion - 60.84 m2 of floor area, 11.62 m high
 Buddhist temple

External links 
 
 City of Busan - Yongdusan Park

References

Parks in Busan